Clifton Duncan Davis (born October 4, 1945) is an American actor, singer, songwriter, minister, and author.

Davis wrote The Jackson 5's No. 2 hit "Never Can Say Goodbye" in 1971. He appeared on Broadway in the musicals Two Gentlemen of Verona and Aladdin. Davis starred in the television shows That's My Mama, Amen, Madam Secretary, and others. He has hosted the Stellar Gospel Music Awards, Gospel Superfest and Lifestyle Magazine. Davis has appeared on the game shows Match Game and Pyramid and appeared in many movies.

Davis is a minister of a Baptist church and has also operated an interdenominational ministry for many years. He has been a guest on the Trinity Broadcasting Network many times. Davis wrote "A Mason-Dixon Memory", one of the chapters in the book Chicken Soup for the Teenage Soul, about the racism which he experienced while growing up.

Early life
Davis was born in Chicago, Illinois, the son of Thelma van Putten Langhorn, a nurse, and Toussaint L'Ouverture Davis, a Seventh-day Adventist minister. He was raised in Mastic, New York, and he is a graduate of Pine Forge Academy, a Black boarding school operated by the Seventh Day Adventist Church. Davis holds a BA in Theology from Oakwood University and a Master of Divinity degree from Andrews University.

Career

Before becoming a successful actor Davis was a songwriter who wrote The Jackson 5's No. 2 hit "Never Can Say Goodbye." He appeared on Broadway as Valentine in Galt MacDermot and John Guare's musical Two Gentlemen of Verona, based on the eponymous Shakespeare comedy. He starred as barber Clifton Curtis in the mid-1970s television show That's My Mama with Theresa Merritt, Theodore Wilson, and Ted Lange.

Davis co-starred with singer and Broadway performer Melba Moore on her musical variety television show. Later he made a guest appearance on the third episode of the first season of The Bobby Vinton Show in September 1975, singing "I've Got the Music in Me" and "Never Can Say Goodbye". He sang the Polish lyrics with Vinton to the show's theme song, titled "My Melody of Love".

A triple heart bypass survivor, Davis participated in the "Superstars" celebrity TV sports competitions of the 1970s as well as made several appearances as one of the celebrity panelists on the game show Match Game. He appeared in the film Scott Joplin, in 1977. Davis made numerous appearances on several incarnations of Pyramid from the early 1970s to the early 1990s.

From 1986 to 1991, Davis co-starred with Sherman Hemsley and Anna Maria Horsford as the Reverend Ruben Gregory in the sitcom Amen, which ran for five seasons. Davis released one acclaimed studio recording in 1991 on Benson Records titled Say Amen. He also played the mayor of Miami in the 1999 film Any Given Sunday. Davis starred in Toronto and on Broadway in Aladdin, playing the Sultan of Agrabah.

Ministry
From 1987 to 1989, he was an Associate Pastor of the Loma Linda University Seventh-day Adventist Church in southern California. For the last twenty-five years, Davis has been an active member of Youthville, USA a children's services organization. He served as the co-founder and co-pastor of the Welcome Christian Center in Huntington Beach, California. Davis is a licensed minister at St. Luke Baptist Church, New York, New York. He has had an interdenominational ministry for over 30 years. Davis has served as its National Spokesperson and Advisory Board Chairman. He is the emcee and host of The Most Soulful Sound, an annual gospel choir competition in Raleigh, North Carolina. Davis also hosts an annual celebrity golf tournament in Elizabeth City State University, where he served as its vice chancellor for Institutional Advancement. Since the end of 2005, Davis has held the position of executive director for Welcome America, a non-profit organization located in Philadelphia, Pennsylvania, which hosts the largest Fourth of July celebration in the nation each year. He is a frequent guest and host on the Trinity Broadcasting Network. Davis also hosted the TV show Gospel Superfest from 2000 to 2008, syndicated by United Television.

Filmography

Film

Television

References

External links

20th-century American male actors
20th-century American singers
21st-century American male actors
21st-century American singers
1945 births
African-American Christians
African-American male actors
American gospel singers
American male film actors
American male musical theatre actors
American male stage actors
American male television actors
Andrews University alumni
Elizabeth City State University faculty
Living people
Male actors from Chicago
Male actors from New York (state)
Oakwood University alumni
People from Mastic, New York
Singers from Chicago
Singers from New York (state)
Songwriters from Illinois
Songwriters from New York (state)
Former Seventh-day Adventists
20th-century American male singers
21st-century American male singers
African-American male singers